The Greek Orthodox Metropolis of Atlanta is one of the Metropolises of the Greek Orthodox Archdiocese of America with 73 parishes.

References

Dioceses of the Greek Orthodox Archdiocese of America